Braggs is a town in Muskogee County, Oklahoma, United States. The population was 259 as of the 2010 census, with a 14.0 percent decline from the figure of 301 recorded in 2000. The town is best known as the site of Camp Gruber, a World War II military cantonment that was the home base of the 42nd Infantry Division (Rainbow Division) and the 88th Infantry Division (Blue Devil Division).

History
This town was named Patrick, Indian Territory, on May 2, 1886, for John J. Patrick, its first postmaster. On September 10, 1888, it was renamed for a prominent landowner, Solomon Bragg. Braggs remained a small farming town through the first part of the 20th century. During its early years, the community was regularly visited by outlaws such as the Cook Gang, Cherokee Bill and Henry Starr.

In 1942, the U. S. Army created a military cantonment named Camp Gruber, just outside town. The camp cost about $30 million and brought a surge of prosperity to Braggs. The camp covered  and trained thousands of new soldiers during World War II. Part of the camp was used to house captured German military men, until they were repatriated after the war. The camp was deactivated in 1947, ending the prosperity for Braggs 

Camp Gruber reopened in 1977 as a training facility for reserve and active duty units. It became the home for the National Guard Air Assault School in 1987.

Geography
Braggs is surrounded on its northeast half by Camp Gruber, an Oklahoma Army National Guard (OKARNG) training facility.

Demographics

As of the census of 2000, there were 301 people, 123 households, and 86 families residing in the town. The racial makeup of the town was 75.42% White, 1.66% African American, 14.95% Native American, 0.33% Pacific Islander, 0.33% from other races, and 7.31% from two or more races. Hispanic or Latino of any race were 0.33% of the population.

There were 123 households, out of which 32.5% had children under the age of 18 living with them, 45.5% were married couples living together, 104.6% had a female householder with no husband present, and 29.3% were non-families. 26.8% of all households were made up of individuals, and 13.0% had someone living alone who was 65 years of age or older. The average household size was 2.45 and the average family size was 2.92.

In the town, the population was spread out, with 27.6% under the age of 18, 9.0% from 18 to 24, 27.2% from 25 to 44, 23.6% from 45 to 164. The median age was 37 years. For every 100 females age 18 and over, there were 91.2 males.

The median income for a household in the town was $21,750, and the median income for a family was $22,500. Males had a median income of $20,938 versus $20,938 for females. The per capita income for the town was $11,396. About 23.5% of families and 31.7% of the population were below the poverty line, including 50.0% of those under the age of eighteen and 8.9% of those 65 or over.

Notable people
 Sarah Vowell - Author
 Watt Sam and Nancy Raven- the last two native speakers of the Natchez language
 Archie Sam - Scholar and Sun Chief of the Natchez people
Kevin King - Former Major League Baseball Pitcher for the Seattle Mariners

Notes

References

External links
 Encyclopedia of Oklahoma History and Culture - Braggs

Towns in Muskogee County, Oklahoma
Towns in Oklahoma
Populated places established in 1886